Weilheim in Oberbayern (English: 'Weilheim in Upper Bavaria') is a town in Germany, the capital of the district Weilheim-Schongau in the south of Bavaria. Weilheim has an old city-wall, historic houses and a museum.

Local history

Up to the 18th century 
The oldest traces of human settlement date back to the Bronze Age and there were grave finds from the Late Roman era. The name Weilheim is interpreted as a home to the Roman villas (land estates). There are, however, several other theories for the roots of the name. Upper Bavaria came in Roman hands through commander Drusus. The Romans built "Via Raetia" in 200 AD, which led over the Brenner Pass to Augsburg. This Roman road ran through the Weilheim area. Around 476 AD, the Romans withdrew southwards and the Bavarians came into the region.

The first documentary mention of the village "Wilhain" dates from 16 April 1010 of the king and later Emperor Heinrich II of Bamberg, who granted the monastery of Polling the property of a farm in Weilheim in 1010. From about 1080 onwards nobleman of Weilheim appeared, they were vassals from Andechs-Meranier and disappeared around 1312. From 1236, there was a palisade fence as a precursor to the town wall. Around 1328, the Munich patrician Ludwig Pütrich enabled the establishment of the Heiliggeistspital (lit.: Holy Spirit Hospital) outside the town walls through donations. An award of the town is named after him. In the Middle Ages, there were several big fires in Weilheim. When a plague epidemic broke out in Munich in 1521, the Bavarian dukes Wilhelm IV and Ludwig temporarily resided in Weilheim. Early in the 17th century, artwork flourished in Weilheim, especially the Weilheimer sculpture school. Well-known representatives from this time were Georg Petel, Hans Krumpper, and Johann Sebastian Degler. In 1611, the so-called Trifthof was set up at the Ammer for log drifting, where tree trunks were bond together as rafts to carry them along the waterway down to the Amper. In 1639, the Franciscan monastery of St. Joseph was founded at the Schmied Gate because of a lack of priests .

19th and 20th century 
The Franciscan monastery in Weilheim was abolished as a result of the secularisation in 1802. 120 houses burnt down and two people were killed in a severe fire disaster in the Oberen Stadt (lit.: upper town) on 3 May 1810. The former Franciscan monastery burnt down in 1825, after which a Heiliggeistspital was built and a hospital on today's Münchner Straße in 1826. On 1 October 1869, the first daily newspaper was published, the "Weilheimer Tagblatt". Between 1872 and 1874, three city gates were demolished, the Obere Tor in 1872, the Schmied Gate in 1873, and the Pöltner Gate in 1874. 24 people were killed and the train station was destroyed by an air raid in the Second World War on 19 April 1945.

Sport
The aeroclub Weilheim-Peißenberg flying at Paterzell airfield is rather successful in glider aerobatics: 2006 German National Champion Markus Feyerabend and Hans-Georg Resch are members of the German national glider aerobatics team.

Transport
Weilheim has a station on the Munich-Garmisch-Partenkirchen railway.

Notable people 

 Markus Acher (born 1967), singer, guitarist and composer
 John Aelbl (born 1552), theologian
 Dominik Bittner (born 1995), ice hockey player
 Franz von Hipper (1863–1932), naval officer, last admiral in the Imperial German Navy in World War I
 Michael Holm (born 1943), lives and works in Weilheim; musician and singer
 Hans Krumpper (c. 1570–1634), Sculptor, plasterer
 Thomas Müller (born 1989), footballer for Bayern Munich and Germany, was born in the area
 Max Nagl (born 1987), motocross biker
 Georg Petel (died 1635), sculptor who became known as German Michelangelo in the 18th century, was born in 1601 or 1602 in Weilheim 
 Wilhelm Röntgen (1845–1923), had a mansion in Weilheim and is an honorary citizen
 Willi Schmid (1893–1934), music critic and poet, as well as victim of confusion of the so-called Night of the long knives (Röhm-Putsch 1934)

International relations

Weilheim in Oberbayern is twinned with:
 Narbonne, France
Yelabuga, Tatarstan, Russian Federation

References

Weilheim-Schongau